Dyschirius tridentatus is a species of ground beetle in the subfamily Scaritinae. It was described by John Lawrence LeConte in 1852.

References

tridentatus
Beetles described in 1852